Queenstown Events Centre, John Davies Oval, or Davies Park is a multi-purpose sports complex and stadium located in Queenstown, Otago in the South Island of New Zealand.

History 

Opened in 1997, the venue is located on Queenstown Lakes District Council–owned land and is a multi-purpose indoor and outdoor venue. The Stadium has a capacity of 19,000 spectators with 6,000 permanent seating and normally 13,000 temporary called in.

Regarded as one of the most spectacular international cricket venues in the world, the ground is located between the foot of the Remarkables and the shores of Lake Wakatipu with Queenstown International Airport's Runway threshold nearby. The venue hosts regular international cricket matches, Highlanders rugby games, trade shows, exhibitions, seminars and concerts. It is also a used by Otago Cricket for List A fixtures.

On 1 January 2014, at the Queenstown Events Centre New Zealand Black Caps' Corey Anderson broke Shahid Afridi's 17-year-old record of the fastest One Day International (ODI) hundred by one ball, scoring his in 36 balls. He eventually ended with an unbeaten 131 that featured 14 sixes and 6 fours  Along with Jesse Ryder, he helped New Zealand set the team record for the most sixes in an ODI innings.

Activities
The Queenstown Events Centre offers many different activities, including cricket, rugby, swimming, golf, fitness training, tennis (indoor and outdoor), netball (indoor and outdoor), and indoor rock climbing. The crentre is also home to several different sport clubs.

Cricket 

A range of formats of the game of Cricket are played at the centre including, One Day Internationals, local Twenty20 competitions, school cricket, and six-a-side competitions. There are also practice nets near the entrance of the centre.

Alpine Aqualand 
The Alpine Aqualand is an indoor water park located to the north of the Queenstown Events Centre stadium. The building has a 25-metre lap pool with 8 lanes, a leisure pool and lazy river, two hydroslides, a toddler pool, learners pools, and hot tubs.

Frankton Golf Centre 
The Frankton Golf Centre is a 9-hole golf course located to the south of the Queenstown Events Centre. The course has a par of 30 with 6 par 3s ranging from 73 metres to 185 metres and 3 par 4s ranging from 280 metres to 310 metres. The current record for the course is 26. The course also has a driving range, a footgolf course, and a pro shop.

Rockatipu Climbing Wall 
The Rockatipu Climbing Wall is an indoor rock climbing wall located within the Queenstown Events Centre. It offers over 40 climbs, vertical and overhanging rock features, classes, kids' climbing courses, and equipment hire.

International centuries
Two ODI centuries have been achieved at the ground. Corey Anderson scored century in 36 ball which was fastest ODI century record, later broken by AB de Villers.

International Five-Wicket Hauls

One Day Internationals

References

External links
 Official website

1997 establishments in New Zealand
Cricket grounds in New Zealand
Rugby union stadiums in New Zealand
Sports venues in Otago
Buildings and structures in Queenstown, New Zealand
1990s architecture in New Zealand
Sport in Queenstown, New Zealand